Myrvoll Station is a railway station at Myrvoll in Oppegård, Norway. Located on the Østfold Line, it is served by the Oslo Commuter Rail line L2 operated by Vy with two hourly services. The station was opened in 1919.

External links

Railway stations in Oppegård
Railway stations on the Østfold Line
Railway stations opened in 1919
1919 establishments in Norway